Taylor Dayne (born Leslie Wunderman; March 7, 1962) is an American singer, songwriter, and actress. She rose to fame in 1987 after her debut single "Tell It to My Heart". Dayne achieved six additional U.S. top-10 singles, including "Love Will Lead You Back", "With Every Beat of My Heart", "Prove Your Love", and "I'll Always Love You".

Dayne has received two Grammy Award nominations, and has won an American Music Award, and multiple New York Music Awards. She has also received New York Hall of Fame honors and was ranked number 18 on Rolling Stone'''s list of the best female dance artists of all time. In December 2016, Billboard magazine ranked her the 28th most successful dance artist of all time.

Singing and acting career
Early success
Taylor Dayne, whose birth name is Leslie Wunderman, was born in Manhattan, New York City, New York, United States, and lived briefly in another borough, The Bronx, until her family moved to Long Island when she was two years old. She began singing professionally after graduating from high school in Baldwin, Nassau County, New York, singing in little-known rock bands such as Felony and Next. She began singing solo after finishing college and, under the name Les Lee, recorded two dance singles, "I'm The One You Want" (1985) and "Tell Me Can You Love Me" (1986), which were released on New York indie label Mega Bolt.

Signed to Arista Records as Taylor Dayne, her first song to crack the top ten was the dance-pop hit "Tell It to My Heart" in late 1987. The song was an instant smash worldwide, peaking in the top five of most major markets worldwide, and reaching number one in many countries, including West Germany. Six more U.S. top-ten hits followed, including "Prove Your Love", "I'll Always Love You", "Don't Rush Me", "With Every Beat of My Heart", "Love Will Lead You Back" and "I'll Be Your Shelter". These were followed by the No. 12 hit "Heart of Stone".

In the United States, she achieved three gold singles, "Tell It to My Heart", "I'll Always Love You", and "Love Will Lead You Back". "I'll Always Love You", a change-of-pace ballad compared to Dayne's earlier releases, was her breakout hit on the Adult Contemporary charts in 1988 and paved the way for future uptempo dance tracks such as "Don't Rush Me" (1988) and "With Every Beat Of My Heart" (1989) to gain acceptance on Adult Contemporary radio. In 1990, "Love Will Lead You Back", a Diane Warren composition, peaked at No. 1 on both the Billboard Hot 100 and the Hot Adult Contemporary Tracks chart.

The string of hits from her first two albums, Tell It to My Heart (1988) and Can't Fight Fate (1989), proved to be the peak of her career. She went on to release two more albums in the 1990s, but had only one more U.S. Top 40 hit, her 1993 cover of Barry White's 1974 hit "Can't Get Enough of Your Love" (from her 1993 album Soul Dancing), which reached No. 2 in the ARIA Charts in Australia but only No. 20 in the U.S.

Together with Arthur Baker and Fred Zarr, Dayne wrote "Whatever You Want" for Tina Turner's 1996 album Wildest Dreams. Dayne later recorded and released the song herself in 1998 as a single from her album Naked Without You. That album failed to chart, but Dayne continued to have hits on the dance charts into the 2000s.

Later singing and acting career
As an actress, Dayne appeared in the 1997 sci-fi television series Nightman as Carla Day. She has had roles in independent films such as Fool's Paradise (1997), Stag (also in 1997) and Jesus the Driver (2004), as well as the Warren Beatty-produced 1994 remake of Love Affair. Dayne also had a recurring role on the Showtime series Rude Awakening.Dayne has performed alongside Marc Bonilla and Dragonchoir. She performed on Broadway in Elton John's Aida in 2001. In 2005, Dayne was featured in the VH1 series Remaking, which featured her close friends Leah Remini and Michelle Reid. The series documents Dayne's return to music after taking time off to have a family (she has twins via a surrogate mother), and premiered her newest song, "Right Now", a result of her collaboration with Rodney Jerkins.

On December 11, 2007, Dayne released the first single, "Beautiful", from her studio album Satisfied. The song was written by Dayne and Hitesh Ceon of production team 3Elementz. Dayne promoted it on many radio stations, including New York's WKTU. "Beautiful" went to No. 1 on the Billboard Dance Charts. She also appeared on The Today Show, Chelsea Lately, Wake Up With Whoopi and VH1. The music video for the single and the Satisfied album cover were shot by Tony Duran, who has also shot album covers for Justin Timberlake and Jennifer Lopez.

Dayne released her fifth album, Satisfied, in February 2008—her first recording studio album in nearly a decade. The album includes both new material and recreations of some of her favorite contemporary songs.

In 2008, Dayne performed at the Paralympic Games in Beijing, China.

In May 2010, Dayne lobbied congressional leaders on Capitol Hill on behalf of NAMM (National Association of Music Merchants) and VH1's Save The Music Foundation to reduce cuts in music education in America's schools.

In July 2010, Dayne released "Facing a Miracle", the official theme song to the 2010 Gay Games. She performed the song to an audience of 50,000 on July 31, 2010, in Cologne, Germany. It ended the year at No. 9 on Perfect Beat's Top Worldwide Singles of 2010. Five years before, however, she had said: "In the eyes of the Kabbalah, [gays] can't be 'married.' That requires actual male and female energy and DNA. In the bigger picture, I think that 'marriage' is about a certain circuitry. I'm as married to my business manager as I would be any husband."

Dayne remastered her Greatest Hits album. She released a new single, "Floor on Fire", on June 22, 2011, which broke the Billboard Dance/Club Charts Top 10.

In 2011-2012 Dayne competed in Rachael vs. Guy: Celebrity Cook-Off, reaching the semifinal round in episode 5 facing off against Lou Diamond Phillips for the final spot to represent Team Rachael. At the end of the episode she lost to Joey Fatone in a runner-up challenge to win $5,000 for charity.

In the early 2010s, American stand-up comedian Tig Notaro began referencing Dayne in her routine, telling stories of having frequent encounters with her. This was ultimately brought to the attention of Ira Glass, who enlisted Notaro to tell the story as part of a live event for This American Life. Dayne herself appeared at the end of the monologue during the event, singing "I'll Always Love You".

In September 2014, Dayne released a new single, "Dreaming".

In late 2020, Dayne competed on season 4 of The Masked Singer as "Popcorn". She made it to the semi-finals of the competition before being unmasked in a triple elimination alongside Chloe Kim as "Jellyfish" and Tori Kelly as "Seahorse".

In August 2022, Dayne competed on season 2 of RuPaul's Secret Celebrity Drag Race under the drag name Electra Owl. 

Personal life
Dayne has never married. She has two children (twins Astaria and Levi), who were born via a surrogate in 2003. Dayne is a supporter of same-sex marriage, and stated in 2014 that she considers the LGBT community to be her most loyal fanbase.

Dayne is Jewish."The Great (Taylor) Dayne Follow-Up". Chandler, Adam., Tabletmag.com, Published December 27, 2012. Accessed June 2016.  She grew up in Baldwin and Freeport, New York, on Long Island.

In 2021, after performing at a New Year party hosted at Mar-a-Lago by then President of the United States, Donald Trump, Dayne declared "I try to stay non-political."

Discography

Studio albums
 Tell It to My Heart (1988)
 Can't Fight Fate (1989)
 Soul Dancing (1993)
 Naked Without You (1998)
 Satisfied'' (2008)

Filmography

Film

Television

See also
 List of number-one hits (United States)
 List of artists who reached number one in the United States
 List of number-one dance hits (United States)
 List of artists who reached number one on the U.S. Dance chart

References

External links

 
 
 

1962 births
20th-century American singers
21st-century American singers
Activists from New York (state)
American dance musicians
American women pop singers
American women singer-songwriters
American freestyle musicians
American house musicians
Dance-pop musicians
Arista Records artists
American LGBT rights activists
Living people
Musicians from the New York metropolitan area
Participants in American reality television series
People from Baldwin, Nassau County, New York
Singer-songwriters from New York (state)
20th-century American women singers
21st-century American women singers
People from Freeport, New York
Jewish singers
Jewish American musicians